The UCI Track Cycling World Championships – Men's individual pursuit is the world championship individual pursuit event held annually at the UCI Track Cycling World Championships. It was first held at the 1939 championships, but had to be abandoned upon the outbreak of World War II, so the first complete competition was at the 1946 championships.

The record number of wins by one rider is five as of 2022, held by Filippo Ganna of Italy.

Medalists

Medal table

External links
Track Cycling World Championships 2016–1893 bikecult.com
World Championship, Track, Individual pursuit, Elite cyclingarchives.com

 
Men's individual pursuit
Lists of UCI Track Cycling World Championships medalists